Chloromethcathinone may refer to:

 3-Chloromethcathinone
 4-Chloromethcathinone